Natalia Malysheva is a Russian freestyle wrestler. She is a bronze medalist at the European Wrestling Championships.

Career 

In 2014, she competed in the women's freestyle 53 kg event at the 2014 World Wrestling Championships held in Tashkent, Uzbekistan. She also competed in the women's freestyle 53 kg event at the 2015 World Wrestling Championships held in Las Vegas, United States where she was eliminated in her first match.

At the 2017 European Wrestling Championships held in Novi Sad, Serbia, she won the silver medal in the women's 53 kg event.

In 2018, she won one of the bronze medals in the women's 53 kg event at the Klippan Lady Open in Klippan, Sweden.

Major results

References

External links 
 

Living people
Year of birth missing (living people)
Place of birth missing (living people)
Russian female sport wrestlers
European Wrestling Championships medalists
European Games competitors for Russia
Wrestlers at the 2015 European Games
21st-century Russian women